Chamaesyrphus is a genus hoverflies, from the family Syrphidae, in the order Diptera.
Small yellow and black flies. Antennae with segment 3 large and almost evenly rounded, the arista only slightly thickened towards base and inserted before the actual anterior dorsal tip of the segment. In contrast to Pelecocera.

Species
C. caledonicus Collin, 1940
C. lusitanicus Mik, 1898
C. nigricornis Santos Abréu, 1924
C. pruinosomaculatus (Strobl, 1906)
C. scaevoides (Fallén, 1817)

References

External links
Images representing Chamaesyrphus scaevoides as Pelecocera scaevoides

Hoverfly genera
Eristalinae
Taxa named by Josef Mik